Cryptochilum is a genus of marine ciliates in the family Cryptochilidae.

Cryptochilum boreale has been recovered from the intestine of Echinus esculentus.

 Names brought to synonymy 
 Cryptochilum elegans Maupas, 1883, a synonym for Uronema elegans (Maupas, 1883) Hamburger & Buddenbrock, 1911

References

External links 
 

 Cryptochilum at the World Register of Marine Species (WoRMS)
 

Philasterida
Ciliate genera